Robe Airport  is an airport in the town of Bale Robe, Ethiopia. It also serves the nearby town of Goba.

Airlines and destinations

References             

OurAirports - Ethiopia
  Great Circle Mapper - Robe

Airports in Ethiopia
Oromia Region